Rabesa Zafera Antoine (born  in Antsohihy, French Madagascar) is a Malagasy. He was President of the University of Mahajanga from 23 April 2010 until 10 October 2014.

Academic career

Studies 
After his graduation, Antoine obtained four postgraduate qualifications, which enabled his progression among the élite of Madagascar and even French itself:
  of the Tertiary College of Tropical Agronomy in Nogent-sur-Marne and Montpellier.
 Doctorate of Science at Claude Bernard University Lyon 1.
 Ph.D.  in plant biology at Pierre and Marie Curie University in the Sorbonne, Paris.
 Certificate of Higher Education in Physiology and Applied pharmacology at Claude Bernard University Lyon 1.

Career 
His professional career is based in the world of higher education, being a professor of the University of Mahajanga teaching general studies, ecology, and general research and development in plant biology in the Faculty of Sciences: He is also an advisor to the University's Rector.

He is known in French academic circles, and in 1990 was given the honorary title of the Grand officier of the Ordre national du mérite of France for his work there and for his contribution to Franco-Malagacian relations. He has made a name for himself in the scientific world by publishing over 34 scientific papers, and has two patents, one for a plant-based anti-asthmatic drug and one for a traditional plant-based Madagascar cosmetic.

Political career

Minister
From 1983 to 1991, Antoine was Minister of Research and Technology Development under Admiral Didier Ratsiraka.

On 26 May 2011, he was appointed Minister of Higher Education and Scientific Research by the Interim President Andry Rajoelina under the head of government, Albert Camille Vital.

Ambassador
After a break of a few years he was asked by Admiral Didier Ratsiraka to represent the Malagasy diplomatic mission to West Germany as Ambassador of Madagascar. Until 2009, he combined this with his professorial role at the University of Mahajanga.

University President
On 23 April 2010, Antoine officially took his position as President of the University of Mahajanga. He wrote a paper detailing ten projects for the development of the university:
 Creation of an Institute of Applied Biology
 Creation of an Institute of Languages and Civiliyations of the Mascarene Islands
 Creation of an Institute of Commercial Foreign Languages
 Creating of a School of Law and Political Science
 Creation of a School of Business Management
 Creation of a Higher School of Industrial Science and Technology" and a Vocational School of Rural, Urban and Civil Engineering
 Creation of a School of Tourism
 Review the progress of the first year of the CDR (Faculty of Medicine)
 Review the natural sciences affiliates, and creation of a materials science affiliate
 Creation of a Technical Centre for the Dissemination of Communication and Information

References

External links
  University of Mahajanga official website

1950 births
Living people
People from Sofia Region
Young Malagasies Determined politicians